Švedas is a Lithuanian language family name. It corresponds to Russian Shved and Polish Szwed or Szweda. In all these languages the word means "Swede".

The surname may refer to:
Jonas Švedas, Lithuanian composer
Robertas Švedas, Lithuanian handballer
Romas Švedas, Lithuanian politician, viceminister of energy

Lithuanian-language surnames
Ethnonymic surnames